The following highways are numbered 374:

Canada
Manitoba Provincial Road 374
 Nova Scotia Route 374
Saskatchewan Highway 374

Japan
 Japan National Route 374

Spain
Autovía A-374

United Kingdom
 A374 road

United States
  Arkansas Highway 374
  Georgia State Route 374
  Maryland Route 374
  Nevada State Route 374
  New York State Route 374
  Ohio State Route 374
  Pennsylvania Route 374
  Puerto Rico Highway 374
  Tennessee State Route 374
  Farm to Market Road 374
  Virginia State Route 374
  Wyoming Highway 374